In linguistics, specifically phonetics and phonology, schwa (rarely  or ; sometimes spelled shwa) is a vowel sound denoted by the IPA symbol , placed in the central position of the vowel chart.

The name schwa and the symbol  may be used for some other unstressed and toneless neutral vowel, not necessarily mid central, as it is often used to represent reduced vowels in general.

In English,  is traditionally treated as a weak vowel that may occur only in unstressed syllables, but accents with the – merger, such as in Welsh English, some higher-prestige Northern England English, and some General American, it is merged with  so  may be considered to occur in stressed syllables.

In Albanian, Romanian, Slovene, Balearic Catalan, Mandarin and Afrikaans, schwa can occur in stressed or unstressed syllables.

A similar sound is the short French unaccented ⟨e⟩, which is rounded and less central, more like an open-mid or close-mid front rounded vowel.

Sometimes the term schwa can be used for any epenthetic vowel. Across languages, schwa vowels are commonly deleted in some instances, such as in Hindi, North American English, French and Modern Hebrew. In phonology, syncope is the process of deleting unstressed sounds, particularly unstressed vowels such as schwa.

Etymology

The term schwa was introduced by German linguists in the 19th century from the Hebrew  (  , classical pronunciation:   [ʃə̑wɔː]), the name of the  sign used to indicate the phoneme. It was first used in English texts in the early 1890s.

The symbol ⟨ə⟩ was used first by Johann Andreas Schmeller for the reduced vowel at the end of the German language term . Alexander John Ellis, in his Palaeotype alphabet, used it for the similar English sound in but . The symbol is an ⟨e⟩ rotated by 180 degrees. A subscript small schwa (in Unicode as ) is used in phonetic transcription of Indo-European languages.

In English
In English, schwa is the most common vowel sound. It is a reduced vowel in many unstressed syllables especially if syllabic consonants are not used. Depending on dialect, it may be written using any of the following letters:

⟨a⟩, as in about 
⟨e⟩, as in taken 
⟨i⟩, as in pencil 
⟨o⟩, as in memory 
⟨u⟩, as in supply 
⟨y⟩, as in sibyl 
unwritten, as in rhythm 

Schwa is a short neutral vowel sound and, like all other vowels, its precise quality varies depending on the adjacent consonants.

In General American English, schwa occurs in both stressed and unstressed syllables, while in Received Pronunciation schwa only occurs in unstressed syllables. Confusingly, some dictionaries use  to represent a stressed schwa in American English (as well as representing the open-mid back unrounded vowel in Received Pronunciation). Dictionaries that do this include the Longman Pronunciation Dictionary and the Cambridge English Pronouncing Dictionary. Dictionaries that use  for schwa regardless of whether it is stressed or unstressed include the Merriam-Webster Collegiate Dictionary, the Oxford English Dictionary, and the Routledge Dictionary of Pronunciation for Current English.

In New Zealand English, the high front lax vowel (as in the word bit ) has shifted open and back to sound like schwa, and both stressed and unstressed schwas exist. To a certain extent, that is true for South African English as well.

Some forms of American English have the tendency to delete a schwa when it appears in a mid-word syllable that comes after the stressed syllable. Kenstowicz (1994) states, "American English schwa deletes in medial posttonic syllables". He gives as examples words such as sep(a)rate (as an adjective), choc(o)late, cam(e)ra and elab(o)rate (as an adjective), where the schwa (represented by the letters in parentheses) has a tendency to be deleted. Other examples include fam(i)ly , ev(e)ry , and diff(e)rent . See also stress and vowel reduction in English.

Examples from other languages

Albanian
In Albanian, schwa is represented by the letter , which is also one of the letters of the Albanian alphabet, coming right after the letter .

Caucasian
Many Caucasian languages and some Uralic languages (like Komi) also use phonemic schwa, and allow schwas to be stressed. In Armenian, schwa is represented by the letter  (capital ). It is occasionally word-initial but usually word-final, as a form of the definite article. Unwritten schwa sounds are also inserted to split initial consonant clusters; for example,   'sparrow'. In the Azerbaijani alphabet, the schwa character  is used, but to represent the  sound.

Germanic languages
The article een (meaning 'a' or 'an') is pronounced using the schwa, while the number een ('one') is pronounced , which is why it's also written as één. And if an  falls at the ultimate (or penultimate) place before a consonant in Dutch words and is unstressed, it may become a schwa in some accents, as in the verb ending  and the diminutive suffix . 

The vowel alternates freely with syllabic consonants /l, m, n/, as in Segel [ˈzeːgəl – ˈzeːglˌ] 'sail'. It also alternates with its absence, as in Segel 'sail' – Segl-er 'sailor'. Thirdly, it may be dropped for rhythmical and other stylistic reasons as in Aug' um Auge, Zahn um Zahn 'An eye for an eye, a tooth for a tooth'.

Schwa is not native to Bavarian dialects of German spoken in Southern Germany and Austria.

Schwa is normally represented in Yiddish by the Hebrew letter  (Ayin) and, as in German, occurs only in unstressed syllables, as in  /ɡəˈfɪltə fɪʃ/ ('stuffed fish').

Hindi and other Indo-Aryan languages

In Hindi grammar Schwa deletion is known as swaraaghaat स्वराघात 

The inherent vowel in the Devanagari script, an abugida used to write Hindi, Marathi, Nepali and Sanskrit, is a schwa, written  either in isolation or word-initially. In most Sanskrit-based languages, the schwa  is the implied vowel after every consonant and so has no didactic marks. For example, in Hindi, the character ⟨ क ⟩ is pronounced /kə/ without marking, but ⟨ के ⟩ is pronounced /ke/ (like "kay") with a marking. Although the Devanagari script is used as a standard to write Modern Hindi, the schwa (sometimes written as ) implicit in each consonant of the script is "obligatorily deleted" at the end of words and in certain other contexts. The phenomenon has been termed the "schwa deletion rule" of Hindi. One formalization of the rule has been summarized as ə → ∅ /VC_CV. In other words, when a vowel-preceded consonant is followed by a vowel-succeeded consonant, the schwa inherent in the first consonant is deleted. However, the formalization is inexact and incomplete (it sometimes deletes a schwa that exists, and it fails to delete some schwas that it should) and so can yield errors. Schwa deletion is computationally important because it is essential to building text-to-speech software for Hindi.

As a result of schwa syncope, the correct Hindi pronunciation of many words differs from that expected from a literal rendering of Devanagari.

Correct schwa deletion is critical also because the same Devanagari letter sequence can sometimes be pronounced two different ways in Hindi depending on the context: failure to delete the appropriate schwas can then change the meaning. However, it is pronounced dhadak.ne in the first and dhad.kaneṁ in the second.

While native speakers correctly pronounce the sequence differently in different contexts, non-native speakers and voice-synthesis software can make them "sound very unnatural", making it "extremely difficult for the listener" to grasp the intended meaning.

Madurese
When writing Madurese in its traditional abugida, Hanacaraka, such words would not be written with a vowel diacritic denoting a schwa. Nowadays, even after the Madurese people have adopted the Latin alphabet, such writing fashion is still used. Examples are:
  – Javanese, Java Island
  – sea, ocean
  – to sail
  – Surabaya
  – Madurese, Madura Island
  – Moon

Malay
In the Indonesian variant, schwa is always unstressed except for Jakarta-influenced informal Indonesian, whose schwa can be stressed. In some cases, the vowel  is pronounced as a stressed schwa (only when the vowel  is located between two consonants in a syllable), but never in formal speech:
 ('viscous'), pronounced .

Indonesian orthography formerly used unmarked  only for the schwa sound, and the full vowel  was written .

In the 1972 spelling reform that unified Indonesian and Malaysian spelling conventions (Ejaan yang Disempurnakan, regulated by MABBIM), it was agreed to use neither diacritic. This means that the pronunciation of any given letter  in both Indonesian and Malaysian variants is not immediately obvious to the learner and must be learned separately. However, in a number of Indonesian dictionaries and lesson books for foreign learners, the notation is preserved to help learners.

The dialect of Kedah in northern Malaysia, however, pronounces final  as  also.

Romance languages

In the Balearic Islands, the sound is sometimes also in stressed vowels,   ('pear').  

Schwa is deleted in certain positions in French.

Slavic languages
In Kashubian schwa is represented by the letter , it derives from historical short u and i vowels, and thus may alternate with u and i stemming from historical long vowels in different grammatical forms of a given word. It never appears word initially, except for the word ë (and) and its derivates. In most dialects of Russian unstressed ⟨a⟩ and ⟨o⟩ reduce to either  or schwa. 

In the Bulgarian language, schwa exists as a sound. It is written with the letter ъ. The vowel ⟨a⟩ is usually reduced to a schwa when unstressed: книгата /'knigətə/ ('the book').

In Serbo-Croatian, schwa is not a phoneme, but it is often colloquially used to pronounce names of consonants. For example, the official name of the letter  is pronounced , but in everyday speech, it is often called .

Welsh
The schwa is denoted in Welsh by the letter  to represent schwa, which is a phonemic vowel rather than the realisation of an unstressed vowel. For example, the word ysbyty ("hospital") is pronounced .

Usage

In seismology
 The schwa is sometimes used to denote a seismic magnitude scales in seismology for representing energy magnitude scales (Mə).

References

Further reading

Niqqud
Vowels.